Abdul Mannan Bhuiyan Stadium is located by the Narsingdi Circuit House and NKM High School & Homes in Narsingdi, Bangladesh. It is one of the biggest stadiums in the district. Now its name has changed.  Its name is Saheed Musleh Uddin Bhuiyan Stadium

See also
Stadiums in Bangladesh
List of cricket grounds in Bangladesh

References

Cricket grounds in Bangladesh
Football venues in Bangladesh
Narsingdi District